Wild Women may refer to:
 Wild Women (1918 film), an American comedy western film
 Wild Women (1951 film), an American adventure film directed by Norman Dawn
 Wild Women (1970 film), an American television western film
 Wild Women (song), a single by Michael Learns to Rock

See also
 Wild Women: Gentle Beasts, a 2015 feature documentary